Andrew Ross (born 16 January 1988) is a Scotland-born Virgin Islander footballer who plays as a forward for the British Virgin Islands national football team.

Career

International career
Ross made his senior international debut on 24 March 2019, coming on as a halftime substitute for Leo Forte in a 2–1 defeat to Bonaire during CONCACAF Nations League qualifying.

Personal life
Ross, a native of Scotland, works as a construction manager and supports Aberdeen.

Career statistics

International

References

External links
Andrew Ross at Caribbean Football Database

1988 births
Living people
British Virgin Islands footballers
British Virgin Islands international footballers
Association football forwards